Virginia School District 706 is the district that covers all Virginia, Minnesota Schools.

Elementary School (K-3) 
Parkview Learning Center

Middle School (4-6) 
Roosevelt Elementary School

High School (7-12) 
Virginia High School

External links
Virginia Schools Homepage

School districts in Minnesota
Education in St. Louis County, Minnesota